Un Chau & So Uk was one of the constituencies in the Sham Shui Po District of Hong Kong which was created in 2011 and abolished in 2019.

The constituency was created in 2011 from the two constituencies of Un Chau and So Uk due to the decrease in population of So Uk Estate as it underwent a period of redevelopment. It loosely covers the two public housing estates, Un Chau Estate and So Uk Estate with an estimated population of 18,626.

Councillors represented

Election results

2010s

References

Constituencies of Hong Kong
Constituencies of Sham Shui Po District Council
2011 establishments in Hong Kong
Constituencies established in 2011
2019 disestablishments in Hong Kong
Constituencies disestablished in 2019
So Uk
Cheung Sha Wan